Fristoe Township is a township in Benton County, in the U.S. state of Missouri.

Fristoe Township was formed on June 18, 1845, taking its name from Judge Markham Fristoe, then on the County Court Bench.

References

Townships in Missouri
Townships in Benton County, Missouri